Mount Ina Coolbrith (formerly Summit Peak) is a mountain of the Sierra Nevada, near the Nevada border in Sierra County, Northern California .

Name
The mountain is visible from Beckwourth Pass through which Ina Coolbrith traveled, at the age of 11, with a party led by James Beckwourth. She would later claim to have been the first white child brought into California.  The mountain was officially renamed in 1932 by the United States Geographic Board with the support of the California State Legislature and the Western Pacific Railroad.

Geography
Most of the mountain, including its summit, is in Sierra County, California. However, the lower northern flanks extend into Plumas County and Lassen County.

See also
:Category:Mountains of Sierra County, California
:Category:Mountains of the Sierra Nevada (United States)

References

Mountains of the Sierra Nevada (United States)
Mountains of Sierra County, California
Humboldt–Toiyabe National Forest
Mountains of Lassen County, California
Mountains of Plumas County, California
Mountains of Northern California